The Diocese of Charlotte (Dioecesis Carolinana) is a Latin Church ecclesiastical territory, or diocese, of the Catholic Church in the Southern United States. It consists of 46 counties in western North Carolina, divided into ten vicariates. The city of Charlotte and the Piedmont Triad are the largest metropolitan areas in the diocese.  Charlotte is a suffragan diocese of the metropolitan Archdiocese of Atlanta.

The Diocese of Charlotte is led by its bishop who serves as pastor of the Cathedral of Saint Patrick in Charlotte. Peter Jugis is the current bishop. The diocese is also home to two of the three basilicas in North Carolina and the largest Roman Catholic parish in the United States:

 Basilica of St. Lawrence in Asheville, North Carolina
 Basilica of Our Lady Help of Christians in Belmont, North Carolina
 St. Matthew Catholic Parish in Charlotte, with over 35,000 members

The total population of the Diocese of Charlotte in 2010 was approximately 4.8 million people. Of this number, 174,689 were registered Catholics (3.6% of the total population), living in over 63,000 households. This number does not include an estimated 230,000 undocumented Hispanic or Latino Catholics.

It encompasses three main population centers:

 Greensboro, High Point, and Winston-Salem
 Charlotte
 The North Carolina mountain region

Vicarates
The Diocese of Charlotte has ten vicariates. They are Albemarle, Asheville, Boone, Gastonia, Greensboro, Hickory, Mecklenburg, Salisbury, Smoky Mountain and Winston-Salem.

History

Vicariate Apostolic of North Carolina and Belmont Abbey 
Between 1820 and 1868, the small number of Catholics in North Carolina were under the jurisdiction of the Diocese of Charleston in South Carolina.  It was a suffragan diocese of the Archdiocese of Baltimore in Maryland.  On March 3, 1868, Pope Pius IX erected the Vicariate Apostolic of North Carolina, removing North Carolina from the Diocese of Charleston.  At that time, the pope appointed Reverend James Gibbons from the Archdiocese of Baltimore as the first vicar apostolic.

When Gibbons became vicar apostolic, North Carolina counted fewer than 700 Catholics. In his first four weeks in office, he traveled almost a thousand miles, visiting towns and mission stations and administering the sacraments. He also befriended many Protestants, who greatly outnumbered Catholics in the state, and preached at their churches. Gibbons made many converts to Catholicism.In 1872, Pius IX appointed Gibbons as bishop of the Diocese of Richmond.  The Vatican would not replace   Gibbons in North Carolina for the next 11 years.

In 1876, Saint Vincent Archabbey in Latrobe, Pennsylvania, sent a party of Benedictine monks to Western North Carolina.  They bought land outside of Charlotte and started a new priory.  Eight years later, Pope Leo XIII elevated the priory to an abbey, known as Belmont Abbey, on December 19, 1884. At that time, the monks elected Father Leo Haid as their first abbot.  in 1882, Leo XIII appointed Henry P. Northrop from the Diocese of Charleston as the new vicar apostolic of North Carolina.  Northrup resigned from this post in 1888 to serve full time as bishop of Charleston.

On February 4, 1888, Pope Leo XIII appointed Haid to also serve as apostolic vicar of North Carolina. Haid was consecrated in Baltimore on July 1, 1888. Pope Pius X later designated Belmont Abbey as a territorial abbey. He transferred eight counties in Western North Carolina (which today make up the Diocese of Charlotte) from the Vicariate Apostolic of North Carolina to Belmont Abbey.  This made Belmont a suffragan of the Archdiocese of Baltimore. This decision created two particular churches united in the person of their ordinary, neither of which was a diocese.  This arrangement endured until Haid's death on July 24, 1924.

Diocese of Raleigh 
On December 12, 1924, Pope Pius XI elevated the Apostolic Vicariate of North Carolina into the Diocese of Raleigh.  It became the first Catholic diocese in the state. The pope appointed Reverend William Hafey of the Archdiocese of Baltimore as its first bishop. In 1937, Pius XI named Hafey as coadjutor bishop of the Diocese of Scranton. To replace Hafey as bishop of Raleigh, the pope appointed Reverend Eugene J. McGuinness from the Archdiocese of Philadelphia that same year. Pope Pius XII transferred seven counties from Belmont Abbey to the new diocese on April 17, 1944. Later in 1944, Pius XII named McGuiness as the new bishop of the Diocese of Oklahoma City. 

Pius XII appointed Vincent Waters from the Diocese of Richmond as the new bishop of the Diocese of Raleigh in 1944. Waters was accused by some of the diocesan clergy of holding on to idle church property worth millions of dollars while some parishes were in debt. He also denied requests for the creation of a priests' senate, and had his resignation requested by around twenty percent of the clergy.In 1953, a year before Brown v. Board of Education decision by the US Supreme Court, Waters ordered the desegregation of all Catholic churches and schools in the diocese. He described racial segregation as a product of "darkness," and declared that "the time has come for it to end." He also said,"I am not unmindful, as a Southerner, of the force of this virus of prejudice among some persons in the South, as well as in the North. I know, however, that there is a cure for this virus, and that is our faith."Pope John XXIII transferred Gaston County from Belmont Abbey to the diocese in July 1960. Although it remained a territorial abbey, Belmont only had jurisdiction now over the abbey grounds.On February 10, 1962,  John XXIII elevated the Diocese of Atlanta to the Archdiocese of Atlanta.  He transferred the Diocese of Raleigh and Belmont Abbey from the Archdiocese of Baltimore to the new archdiocese.

Diocese of Charlotte 
Pope Paul VI erected the Diocese of Charlotte on November 12, 1971. The new diocese contained Belmont Abbey and the counties previously under its jurisdiction from the Diocese of Raleigh.  The Diocese of Charlotte was designated a suffragan diocese of the Archdiocese of Atlanta.  When the new diocese was established, the Catholic population of the area was just over 34,000.

The first bishop of Charlotte was Reverend Michael Begley, a priest from the Diocese of Raleigh, who was installed on January 12, 1972.Paul VI transferred Belmont Abbey into the Diocese of Charlotte, ending its status as a territorial abbey on January 1, 1977.  Begley served as bishop until his retirement in May 1984.  Pope John Paul II appointed Reverend John Donoghue from the Archdiocese of Washington as the second bishop of Charlotte on November 5, 1984, with his installation on December 18, 1984. The Catholic population in Charlotte continued to grow, leading  Donoghue declared in the early 1990's that it would be the Decade of Evangelization. In 1993, John Paul II appointed him as archbishop of the Archdiocese of Atlanta.

Donoghue was succeeded as bishop of Charlotte by Auxiliary Bishop William G. Curlin from the Archdiocese of Washington on April 13, 1994. Curtin started the first affordable housing initiative in the diocese and concentrated on ministry to the elderly, sick and dying. As bishop, Curlin continued his ministry to the poor, ordained 28 men to the priesthood and opened numerous Churches throughout the diocese.  On June 13, 1995, Curlin invited Mother Teresa to speak at the Charlotte Coliseum, drawing a crowd of over 19,000.  In 1995, Curlin stated that any priest in the diocese who had been accused of sexual abuse of a minor would be immediately removed from ministry.Curlin served until his retirement on September 10, 2002. By 2002, the diocese had grown to approximately 87,000 Catholics. 

On August 1, 2003, John Paul II appointed Monsignor Peter J. Jugis, judicial vicar of the Diocese of Charlotte, as its fourth bishop. He was consecrated on October 24, 2003.  Jugis is the current bishop of Charlotte. In December 2019, Reverend Father Patrick T. Hoare, pastor at St. Matthew Catholic Church in Charlotte, was placed on administrative leave by the diocese after it received an accusation that Hoare had inappropriate relations with minors before and after entering the priesthood.  Hoare denied the charges. He was removed permanently as pastor in 2020.  Hoare has appealed his removal to the Vatican Dicastery for the Clergy, but it was rejected.  He then appealed in 2022 to the Apostolic Signatura, but was rejected again.  Hoare has made a final appeal to a larger body of the Apostolic Signatura.

Sexual abuse cases 
On November 1, 2019, the North Carolina House of Representatives and the North Carolina Senate passed legislation extending the statute of limitations for filing sex abuse lawsuits. While North Carolina has no statute of limitations for criminal sex abuse cases, there still are statute of limitations in place for civil sex abuse lawsuits.

On December 30, 2019, Bishop Jugis released a list of 14 priests credibly accused of sexual abuse in the diocese since 1972. On March 2, 2020, the diocese added two more names to this list. This list did not include clergy accused of sexual abuse in territory controlled by the diocese prior to 1972;  these men were named in a list titled "Western North Carolina." Former clergy who served in the diocese, but were accused of committing sex abuse "elsewhere", were listed separately as well.

Yurgel case 
In 2009, Robert Yurgel, a former priest at St. Matthew's Parish, was arrested after pleading guilty to second-degree sexual offense of a minor. Yurgel had sexually abused a 14-year-old altar boy in 1999.  In February 2009, Yurgel pleaded guilty to child molestation and was sentenced to seven years in state prison. He was dismissed from the Order of Friars Minor Capuchin and laicized in 2000. The victim sued Yurgel and the Diocese of Charlotte. The case was settled for $1 million in damages and an additional $40,000 to pay for the victim's therapy. Yurgel was released from prison in August 2016. On December 14, 2020, a California man filed a lawsuit against the diocese, claiming that Robert Yurgel had sexually abused him when he was five to seven years old at St. Mathew's Parish in the late 1990s.

Spangenberg case 
On August 14, 2018, a grand jury report released by the Pennsylvania attorney general named 301 priests responsible for allegedly abusing over 1,000 children within six Pennsylvania dioceses over 70 years. One of them was Robert Spangenberg, a Spiritan priest who served in the Dioceses of Charlotte and Raleigh. Spangenberg was a pastor at St. James Parish in Hamlet, North Carolina, in the 1990s. David Hains, diocese spokesperson, stated that the Diocese of Charlotte never received any concerns from Congregation of the Holy Spirit about Spangenberg's behavior in Pennsylvania, and that there had been no complaints about him in North Carolina.

West case 
On March 25, 2019, the diocese announced that Monsignor Mauricio West, its vicar general and chancellor, had resigned from his posts.  The diocese had received allegations against West of unwanted sexual advances towards an adult student at Belmont Abbey College in the 1980s.  Taking a leave of absence, West denied all the accusations. The Lay Review Board of the diocese found these allegations to be credible. In November 2019, four more complaints of sexual misconduct were lodged against West.  Two of the accusations came from diocese employees, the other two from Belmont students.

Kelleher and Farwell cases 
On April 14, 2020, two sex abuse lawsuits were filed against the diocese.  The plaintiffs alleged that the diocese shielded two credibly accused priests, Richard Farwell and Joseph Kelleher. The lawsuits were filed previously, but both were dismissed due to the previous statute of limitations. The plaintiffs were able to sue again because of the 2019 changes to state law.

 The Kelleher lawsuit was filed by a Georgia man who claimed that Kelleher sexual assaulted him multiple times when he was a teenager between 1977 and 1978.  A judged dismissed the 2010 lawsuit due to the passing of the statute of limitations.  Another judge dismissed a 2014 criminal case because Kelleher had been diagnosed with dementia.
 The Farwell lawsuit was filed by a North Carolina man who was a teenager in 1977.  He alleged that Farwell started abusing him after he went to the priest for counseling. The plaintiff file a lawsuit against Farwell in 2011, but it was dismissed due to the statute of limitations.  Farwell was later accused by a second man.  Farwell was later convicted of contributing to the delinquency of a minor, sentenced to probation, and removed from ministry in 2005.

Baker case 
In November 2021, the diocese was sued by man who claimed he had been sexually assaulted by Donald Baker, a diocese priest, in the 1980s.  The plaintiff had made his accusation to the diocese in 2017.  Baker left the ministry in 1994 and is on the list of diocese priests with credible accusations of sexual abuse of minors.

Older Mass form
In December 2007, 14 priests of the diocese attended a five-day workshop on the 1962 version of the Mass, the legitimacy of whose continued public use in certain circumstances was recognized in July of that year. Father Samuel Weber OSB was the first to offer a regularly scheduled Mass in that form in the Diocese of Charlotte since 1969.  He celebrated this version in October 2007 at Davis Chapel of Wake Forest University. Bishop Jugis noted that it would take some time, but that the diocese was trying to accommodate those with an attachment to this form of mass. On the following January 13, the Tridentine Latin Mass or usus antiquor (older form) was celebrated for the first time in nearly 40 years at Our Lady Of Grace Church in Greensboro, with Jugis attending.

Bishops of Charlotte
 Michael Joseph Begley (1971–1984)
 John Francis Donoghue (1984–1993)
 William G. Curlin (1994–2002)
 Peter Joseph Jugis (2003–present)

Catholic News Herald

Catholic News Herald is the official publication of the diocese. It has the slogan "Serving Christ and Connecting Catholics in Western North Carolina." It publishes news from the diocese, general Catholic and world news with a Catholic perspective. The newspaper was established in 1991 and publishes 26 issues per year.  It also carries a regular supplement in Spanish within the publication. This publication should be differentiated from the British publication Catholic Herald.

Schools

Mecklenburg Area Catholic Schools (MACS)

High schools 
 Charlotte Catholic High School (Charlotte)
 Christ the King Catholic High School (Huntersville)
 Canongate Catholic High School (Arden)

Grades six to eight 
Holy Trinity Catholic Middle School

Pre-kindergarten through grade eight 
Our Lady of Assumption Catholic School
St. Mark Catholic School

Other preschools and elementary schools 
St. Ann Catholic School (PK, TK-5)
St. Gabriel Catholic School (K-5)
St. Matthew Catholic School (TK-5)
St. Patrick Catholic School (K-5)

Other schools in the diocese

High schools 
 Bishop McGuinness Catholic High School (Kernersville)

Pre-kindergarten through grade eight 
Asheville Catholic School (Asheville)
Immaculata Catholic School (Hendersonville)
Our Lady of Mercy Catholic School (Winston-Salem)
St. Leo Catholic School (Winston-Salem)
Immaculate Heart of Mary Catholic School (High Point)
Sacred Heart Catholic School (Salisbury)
St. Michael Catholic School (Gastonia)
St. Pius X Catholic School (Greensboro)
Our Lady of Grace Catholic School (Greensboro)

Notable parishes
 Cathedral of St. Patrick (Charlotte)
 St. Matthew Catholic Church (Charlotte)
 St. Peter's (Charlotte)
 Basilica of St. Lawrence (Asheville)
 Basilica of Our Lady Mary Help of Christians (Belmont)
 Our Lady of Grace Church (Greensboro)
 St. Benedict Catholic Church (Greensboro)
 St. Philip's Roman Catholic Church (Statesville)
 Sacred Heart Church (Salisbury)

See also

 Historical list of the Catholic bishops of the United States
 List of the Catholic dioceses of the United States
 List of Roman Catholic archdioceses (by country and continent)
 List of Roman Catholic dioceses (alphabetical) (including archdioceses)
 List of Roman Catholic dioceses (structured view) (including archdioceses)

References

External links
Roman Catholic Diocese of Charlotte Official Site
Catholic Hierarchy Profile of the Diocese of Charlotte
Catholic News Herald - diocesan newspaper

 
Charlotte
Diocese of Charlotte
Christian organizations established in 1971
Charlotte
Charlotte